Frank Lionel O'Keefe, AM (6 October 1912 – 21 April 1989) was an Australian politician. Born in Gunnedah, New South Wales, he attended state schools before becoming a farm machinery distributor and oil merchant. He was mayor of Gunnedah Shire Council for 18 years, and also served on Namoi Valley County Council. In 1961 he was elected to the New South Wales Legislative Assembly for Liverpool Plains, representing the Country Party; he transferred to Upper Hunter in 1962, which he held until 1969.  In that year he was elected to the Australian House of Representatives as the member for Paterson. He held the seat until its abolition in 1984, at which time he retired. O'Keefe died in 1989.

References

National Party of Australia members of the Parliament of Australia
Members of the Australian House of Representatives for Paterson
Members of the Australian House of Representatives
Members of the New South Wales Legislative Assembly
Members of the Order of Australia
1912 births
1989 deaths
Port Stephens Council
National Party of Australia members of the Parliament of New South Wales
20th-century Australian politicians